Peter Thomas Scolari (September 12, 1955 – October 22, 2021) was an American actor. He was best known for his roles as Michael Harris on Newhart (1984–1990), Henry Desmond on Bosom Buddies (1980–1982) and Wayne Szalinski on Honey, I Shrunk the Kids (1997–2000). Scolari received three Emmy nominations for his work on Newhart and won the Primetime Emmy Award for Outstanding Guest Actor in a Comedy Series for his recurring role as Tad Horvath on Girls in 2016.

Early life

Scolari was born in New Rochelle, New York, on September 12, 1955. He described his father as an abusive, "rageful man" and his mother as an alcoholic, and has said that their marriage was tumultuous. "They stayed together for the kids and also because they were hopelessly in love with each other, but they were totally incompatible," he said in an interview with the Toronto Star.
Scolari was active in the Theatre Department of Occidental College in Eagle Rock, California in 1970's. He left the school after two years to pursue his professional career.

Career

Television

Scolari's first ongoing role was in the short-lived 1980 sitcom Goodtime Girls as the juggling neighbor of the title characters. He and Tom Hanks were then cast in another sitcom, Bosom Buddies, as men who disguise themselves as women to live in an affordable apartment in a women's-only residence. After Bosom Buddies was canceled in 1982, Scolari joined the cast of Newhart in 1984, in which he played Michael Harris, a yuppie local TV producer. Scolari stayed with the series until its conclusion in 1990.

Following central roles in the unsuccessful series Family Album and Dweebs, Scolari spent three seasons playing inventor Wayne Szalinski, a role originated on film by Rick Moranis, in the TV adaptation of the Disney film Honey, I Shrunk the Kids. He later had a recurring role as the father of Lena Dunham's character on HBO's Girls, for which he won an Emmy in 2016. He also portrayed Gotham City’s corrupt police commissioner Gillian B. Loeb in Fox’s superhero crime drama Gotham and Bishop Marx on Paramount's series  Evil (2019–2021).

Broadway
Scolari appeared on Broadway in Wicked (as the Wizard of Oz), Sly Fox, Hairspray and Lucky Guy, which reunited him with his Bosom Buddies co-star Hanks. Scolari also appeared Off-Broadway in Old Man Joseph and His Family, The Exonerated, In the Wings, The Music Man and White's Lies.

In 1996, Scolari starred in a version of the stage musical Stop the World – I Want to Get Off, produced for the A&E television network.

In 2014, Scolari portrayed Yogi Berra in Bronx Bombers. His wife Tracy Shayne played Berra's wife Carmen.

Personal life
Scolari was married to Debra Steagal and later to actress Cathy Trien, with whom he had two children. He married his longtime girlfriend, actress Tracy Shayne, in June 2013. 

A 2014 episode of Oprah: Where Are They Now? brought up Scolari's substance abuse and his struggle with bipolar disorder.

Scolari was an avid juggler and occasionally showcased his talents on television, including a performance during the 1982 Circus of the Stars and in talk-show appearances.

Death
Scolari died from leukemia in Manhattan on October 22, 2021, at age 66. He had been diagnosed with the disease two years earlier.

Filmography

Film

Television

References

External links 
 
 
 
 

1955 births
2021 deaths
20th-century American male actors
21st-century American male actors
American male film actors
American male stage actors
American male television actors
American male voice actors
American people of Italian descent
Deaths from cancer in New York (state)
Deaths from leukemia
Edgemont Junior – Senior High School alumni
Male actors from New Rochelle, New York
People with bipolar disorder
Primetime Emmy Award winners